Damjan Ostojič (born 26 October 1986 in Ljubljana, Slovenia) is a Slovenian former competitive figure skater who represented both Slovenia and Bosnia and Herzegovina in competition. 

Representing Bosnia and Herzegovina, he is the 2007 Merano Cup silver medalist, and a three-time Bosnian national champion (2007-2009).

Representing Slovenia, he is a three-time Slovenian national silver medalist (2004, 2006, 2007) and a four-time Slovenian national bronze medalist (2001-2003, 2005).

On the junior level for Slovenia, he is a two-time Dragon Trophy champion (2002, 2004) and the 2005 Merano Cup silver medalist.

Programs

Competitive highlights

For Bosnia and Herzegovina

For Slovenia

References

External links 

 
 Damjan Ostojič at PixieWorld
 Damjan Ostojic at Tracings

Slovenian male single skaters
Bosnia and Herzegovina figure skaters
Sportspeople from Ljubljana
Living people
1986 births